Dick Barrett may refer to:

 Dick Barrett (baseball) (1906–1966), pitcher in Major League Baseball
 Richard Barrett (Irish republican) (1889–1922), known as Dick, Irish Republican Army volunteer executed in 1922 during the Irish Civil War
 Dick Barrett (politician) (born 1942), Democratic member of the Montana Legislature
 Dicky Barrett (trader), (1807–1847), New Zealand settler and trader

See also 
 Richard Barrett (disambiguation)